DjangoFest is a series of music festivals celebrating the music of Django Reinhardt and other forms of gypsy jazz and traditional gypsy music.  There are three annual festivals: DjangoFestNW, a 5-day festival produced by Whidbey Island Center for the Arts, DjangoFest San Francisco, a three-day festival held at the Throckmorton Theater in Mill Valley, California, DjangoFest Los Angeles a one-day festival held in Laguna Beach, and DjangoFest Colorado held in Mt. Crested Butte

This blend of Eastern European melodies, Parisian Bal-musette, Spanish Flamenco and American Swing music was created by Reinhardt and his fellow Gypsy musicians in the cafes of Paris during the 1930s and 1940s.

There are related festivals in other parts of the world such as Django Reinhardt Jazz Festival in Samois-sur-Seine, France and another in Hildesheim, Germany.

Notes and references

External links
 DjangoFest Gypsy Jazz Swing Guitar Music Festivals

Gypsy jazz
Tourist attractions in Island County, Washington
Folk festivals in the United States
Festivals in Washington (state)
Romani in the United States
Romani music
Jazz festivals in the United States